Walleria is a genus of plants in the  Tecophilaeaceae, first described as a genus in 1864. It is native to central and southern Africa.

Species
 Walleria gracilis (Salisb.) S.Carter - Namibia, Cape Province 
 Walleria mackenziei J.Kirk - Zaire, Tanzania, Angola, Zambia, Malawi, Mozambique  
 Walleria nutans J.Kirk - Angola, Zimbabwe, Botswana, Namibia, South Africa

References

External links

Asparagales genera